Mor Severios Abraham is a Syriac Orthodox bishop. , he is the Metropolitan of Angamali region of the Angamali Diocese and Abbott of Mor Gabriel Dayro (Monastery). He is the most senior metropolitan in the Jacobite Syrian Orthodox Church.

Early years

Abraham Alukkal was born as member of the Alukkal family in Peechanikkad, Ankamali on 12 July 1941. In 1965 he was ordained deacon by Mor Gregorios Geevarghese Vayaliparambil of Ankamali. In the same year he was ordained by Mor Gregorios as 'Kasshisso'.

Education 

He graduated from Community College, Chicago and completed his theological studies from Russian Leningrad Theological Academy and Theological College at Wycliffe Hall, Oxford. He obtained his Th.D. degree from Pacific Western University (California). Abraham served as the vicar of St. Peter's Church in Chicago under Archbishop Mor Athanasius Yeshue Samuel from 1979 to 1981. Before this, he was at the  Thrikkunnathu Seminary in Aluva. In 1982, the Ankamali Diocesan Council, held under Dionysius Thomas (Aboon Mor Baselios Thomas I), chose Abraham as the Assistant Metropolitan of the Diocese.

Ordination 

Abraham was ordained metropolitan in the name Mor Severios on 6 March 1982, in a ceremony presided by Mor Ignatius Zakka I Iwas and assisted by the Catholicose Aboon Mor Baselios Paulose II at the Marthoman Cheriapally, Kothamangalam. Mor Severios Abraham is the only prelate ordained by Patriarch Mor Ignatius Zakka I Iwas in Malankara.

Charity works 

After assuming charge as the auxiliary bishop of Ankamali Diocese, Abraham Mor Severios commenced many charity programs. He founded the Guardian Angel Institution in 1985. A list of few institutions started by Severios are:

Guardian Angel Retirement Home, (1984) Kilikulam, Airapuram PO.
Bethsada Destitute Home for the Dying, Vengola.
Yeldho Mor Baselios orphanage, Kothamangalam.
Bethsaida Public School, Vengola.
Bethsaida Junior school, Kilikulam.
Bethsaida Mental Health Center, Vengola (1993).
Peace mission, Nedumbassery.
Mor Gabriel Dayro (Monastery).

Responsibilities 
:
Abbot of Mor Gabriel Dayaro, Vengola
Metropolitan of Ankamali Region of Ankamali Diocese

See also

Syriac Orthodox Church
Jacobite Syrian Christian Church

References 
Jacobite Syrian Church
 www.syriacchristianity.org
 www.lightoflife.com
 Souvenir published by Ankamali Diocese

1941 births
Living people
Syriac Orthodox Church bishops
Indian Oriental Orthodox Christians
California Miramar University alumni
People from Angamaly